, provisional designation , is an asteroid on an eccentric orbit, classified as near-Earth object and potentially hazardous asteroid of the Apollo group, approximately 3 kilometers in diameter. The asteroid was discovered on 10 June 2004, by astronomers of the LINEAR program at Lincoln Laboratory's Experimental Test Site near Socorro, New Mexico, in the United States. It is one of the largest potentially hazardous asteroids known to exist.

Orbit and classification 

 is a member of the dynamical Apollo group, which are Earth-crossing asteroids. Apollo asteroids are the largest subgroup of near-Earth objects.

The body orbits the Sun at a distance of 0.9–3.6 AU once every 3 years and 5 months (1,244 days; semi-major axis of 2.26 AU). Its orbit has an eccentricity of 0.59 and an inclination of 23° with respect to the ecliptic. Its observation arc begins with a precovery from the Digitized Sky Survey taken at the Siding Spring Observatory, Australia, in February 1995, more than 9 years prior to its official discovery observation at Socorro.

Close approaches 

With an absolute magnitude of at least 15.4,  is one of the brightest and presumably largest known potentially hazardous asteroid (see PHA-list). On 16 November 2038, this asteroid will make its closest near-Earth encounter at a nominal distance of 0.0198 AU (7.7 LD). It is also classified as a Mars-crosser, crossing the orbit of the Red Planet at 1.66 AU.

Physical characteristics 

 is an assumed stony S-type asteroid.

Rotation period 

Three rotational lightcurves of  have been obtained from photometric observations by Johanna Torppa, Adrián Galád and Brian Warner since 2004. Lightcurve analysis gave a consolidated rotation period of 2.7247 hours with a brightness amplitude between 0.15 and 0.59 magnitude.

Diameter and albedo 

According to the survey carried out by the NEOWISE mission of NASA's Wide-field Infrared Survey Explorer,  measures 3.07 kilometers in diameter and its surface has an albedo of 0.13. The Collaborative Asteroid Lightcurve Link assumes a standard albedo for stony asteroids of 0.20 and calculates a diameter of 2.47 kilometers, based on an absolute magnitude of 15.4.

Numbering and naming 

This minor planet was numbered by the Minor Planet Center on 30 June 2007. As of 2018, it has not been named.

Notes

References

External links 
 Asteroid Lightcurve Database (LCDB), query form (info )
 Dictionary of Minor Planet Names, Google books
 
 
 

159857
159857
159857
20040610